Pieter Steenwijck (c. 1615, Delft – 1666, Delft), was a Dutch Golden Age painter.

Early life
Steenwyck was born in Delft,  1615. He was the brother of Harmen Steenwijck, also a still-life painter. His father was Evert Hamenz who was an eyeglass maker. He and his brother were taught to paint by their uncle David Bailly in Leiden. Baily is credited with inventing the vanitas genre and he influenced Steenwyck to paint in the vanitas genre.

Career
In 1642 he became a member of the Delft Guild of St. Luke and in 1644 he became a member of the Leiden Guild of St. Luke.

References

External links

Pieter Steenwijck on Artnet

1615 births
1666 deaths
Dutch Golden Age painters
Dutch male painters
Dutch still life painters
Artists from Delft
Painters from Delft
Painters from Leiden